Shakin' All Over is the debut studio album by the Canadian rock band The Guess Who, although at the time they were known as "Chad Allan & the Expressions". It is regarded as a garage rock album and features their hit version of Johnny Kidd & the Pirates hit song "Shakin' All Over".

The 2001 release of Shakin' All Over is actually a collection of tracks from the band's first three albums.

Canadian release on Quality
All songs written and composed by Chad Allan except where noted.

US release on Scepter

2001 Shakin' All Over collection

Personnel
Chad Allan – lead vocals, rhythm guitar
Randy Bachman – lead guitar, backing vocals
Jim Kale – bass, backing vocals
Garry Peterson – drums
Bob Ashley – keyboards, backing vocals

Charts
Singles

References

1965 debut albums
The Guess Who albums
Scepter Records albums
Quality Records albums